Napoletans is a 2011 Italian film directed by Luigi Russo.

Plot
In a small town in southern Italy there is the family Di Gennaro. Gennaro, the householder, is a noted dentist, married to Anna, a housewife, a few years converted to Buddhism. They have two sons: Roberto, last year medical student and guitarist in a small band, and Mattia who attended the first year of high school. Apparently the Di Gennaro just seem a perfect family, but each character hides flaws and excesses.

References

External links

2011 films
Italian comedy films
2010s Italian-language films
2010s Italian films